The 2013–14 Botola is the 57th season of the Moroccan Top League, but the 3rd under its new format of Moroccan Pro League.

Average attendance

Raja Casablanca 20,000

KAC Kénitra 8,000

Moghreb Tétouan 8,000

Wydad Casablanca 5,000

Hassania Agadir 3,000

Kawkab Marrakech 3,000

Maghreb Fès 3,000

Chabab Rif Hoceima 2,000

Difaâ El Jadida 2,000

Olympic Safi 2,000

RSB Berkane 2,000

AS Salé 1,500

Olympique Khouribga 1,200

Wydad Fès 1,200

FAR Rabat 1,000

FUS Rabat 800

Overview

Promotion and relegation
Teams promoted from 2012–13 Botola 2
 KAC Marrakech
 Association Salé

Teams relegated to 2013–14 Botola 2
 CODM de Meknès
 Raja Beni Mellal

Stadiums and locations

League table

Season statistics

Top goalscorers
.

References

External links

Season at soccerway.com

Botola seasons
Morocco
1